Desnjak is a settlement in the eastern Slovene Hills in the Municipality of Ljutomer in northeastern Slovenia. The area traditionally belonged to the Styria region and is now included in the Mura Statistical Region.

There is a small chapel-shrine in the settlement is dedicated to the Virgin Mary. It belongs to the Parish of Cezanjevci. It was built in 1889 and renovated in 1994.

References

External links
Desnjak on Geopedia

Populated places in the Municipality of Ljutomer